Celebrities Under Pressure is a British game show that aired on ITV from 13 September 2003 to 7 August 2004. It was first hosted by Melanie Sykes for series 1 & 2 and then hosted by Vernon Kay for series 3.

Format
The show follows families allowing a celebrity to live with them for a week as they attempt to learn a new skill from their hosts. The celebrity's progress is followed through a video diary, before they are tested in a live studio situation. If successful, the celebrity will win a string of prizes for the family they stayed with, however, if they fail, the family goes home with nothing.  The show relates strongly to an earlier ITV game show The Moment of Truth, which is the same concept, but with one member of the family, not celebrities.

Participants

Series 1
Show 1 – Samantha Fox, Tara Palmer Tomkinson, Brian Dowling
Show 2 – Samia Ghadie, Uri Geller, Kerry McFadden
Show 3 – Phil Tufnell, Fiona Phillips, Bruce Jones
Show 4 – Jono Coleman, Catalina Guirado, Linda Lusardi
Show 5 – Antony Audenshaw, Tony Hadley, Sonia
Show 6 – Ben Freeman, Lesley Joseph, Andrew Whyment

Series 2
Show 1 – Terri Dwyer, John Fashanu, Ken Morley
Show 2 – Jodie Marsh, John Barnes, Tamara Beckwith
Show 3 – Amy Nuttall, Ben Shephard, Antony Worrall Thompson
Show 4 – Kate Garraway, Alan Halsall, James Hewitt

Series 3
Show 1 – Chris Finch, The Cheeky Girls, Nell McAndrew
Show 2 – Dominic Brunt, Jennie McAlpine, Barry McGuigan
Show 3 – Alison Hammond, Daniel MacPherson, Caprice Bourret
Show 4 – Stephen Mulhern, Linda Robson, Jenni Falconer

Transmissions

Ratings
Episode Viewing figures from BARB.

Series 1

Series 2

Series 3

References

External links

2003 British television series debuts
2004 British television series endings
2000s British game shows
English-language television shows
ITV game shows
Television series by ITV Studios
Television shows produced by Granada Television
British television series based on Japanese television series